The Cast of Beatlemania is a U.S. Beatles' tribute band formed in 1980. The Cast is one of longest running Beatles' tribute band in the world. The group features founder Lenie Colacino, a former cast member of the 1977 Broadway hit musical Beatlemania. The group has performed in all contiguous U.S. states, and over twenty foreign countries, including Canada, England, Mexico, Central and South America, Brazil and Japan.

The Cast recreates the sights and sounds of The Beatles from an era of the 1960s when the world was engulfed in the throes of Beatlemania. Three different costumes coincide with the changing music and times during their existence.

History
The Cast was individually selected from hundreds of musicians who auditioned from all over the U.S. for the Broadway show, Beatlemania.

The Cast originally started when the members of the ending Broadway show were let go as the show came to a conclusion in late 1979.  Those four members (Lenie Colacino, Richie Gomez, Mike Palaikis and Bob Forte) started The Cast and the same group name has been in existence since the early 1980s.

This current incarnation of the show is the most popular version since inception, having retained the same members for the longest period of time.

Concept

Members

The current members are:

Carlo Cantamessa (as John Lennon) — rhythm guitar, bass guitar, piano, lead vocal
 The manager of the band.
Lenie Colacino (as Paul McCartney) — bass guitar, piano, lead vocal
 Founder of The Cast and the first left-handed member of the original Broadway production of Beatlemania
 Voices of the “Beetles” on the Nickelodeon's Wonder Pets
Monroe Quinn (as George Harrison) — lead guitar, lead vocal
 Previously has performed with Billy Preston, Micky Dolenz of The Monkees, Peter Noone of Herman’s Hermits, Neil Innes, Joey Mallond of Badfinger, and Denny Laine from Wings and The Moody Blues.
John Delgado (as Ringo Starr) — drums, percussion, lead vocal

Larry Hochman — keyboards, musical director, arranger

Songs

 Act I

 "I Want to Hold Your Hand"
 "Yesterday"
 "I Saw Her Standing There"
 "Act Naturally"
 "This Boy"
 "Lose That Girl"
 "From Me to You"
 "Help!"
 "Please Please Me"
 "In My Life"
 "All My Loving"
 "Nowhere Man"
 "A Hard Days Night"
 "I Feel Fine"
 "Happy Just to Dance"
 "Day Tripper"
 "I Call Your Name"
 "Twist & Shout"

 Act II

 "Sgt. Pepper's Lonely Hearts Club Band"
 "Back in USSR"
 "With a Little Help From My Friends"
 "Birthday"
 "Lucy in the Sky With Diamonds"
 "Something"
 "Strawberry Fields Forever"
 "Penny Lane"
 "I Am the Walrus"
 "Lady Madonna"
 "Taxman"
 "Hey Jude"
 "While my Guitar Gently Weeps"
 "Here Comes the Sun"
 "Got to Get You into My Life"
 "Get Back"
 "Come Together"
 "Revolution"

See also
Beatlemania

External links
 Moptops.com - Official CAST website  (Flash and JavaScript required)
 Positive user ratings of the show at BeatleLinks
 The Cast Facebook

The Beatles tribute bands
Musicals based on songs by the Beatles